Doug Quelland, born June 15, 1948, is an Arizonian politician. He currently has no party affiliation but has previously run as a Republican. He ran unsuccessfully for U.S. House of Representatives in 1998 and successfully for the Arizona House of Representatives, District 10, in 2002 and 2004. Quelland was voted out in 2006 and then back in again in 2008. He was forced to resign in 2010 after a government investigative commission found that he'd violated campaign finance laws in his 2008 campaign. He ran unsuccessfully again for the Arizona House in 2010, and lost bids for a seat in the Arizona Senate in 2012, 2014 and 2016 as well.

Elections

Source: AZSos.gov Historical Elections

References

External links
 Votesmart
 Ballotpedia

Living people
Republican Party Arizona state senators
Place of birth missing (living people)
Year of birth missing (living people)
Politicians from Phoenix, Arizona
21st-century American politicians
Candidates in the 1998 United States elections
Candidates in the 2010 United States elections
Candidates in the 2012 United States elections
Candidates in the 2014 United States elections
Candidates in the 2016 United States elections